Karlo is an Albanian, Basque, Croatian and Esperanto masculine given name as well as a Slovene masculine given name that serves as a Slovene diminutive form of Karel.

Given name

Karlo Aspeling (born 1987), South African rugby player 
Karlo Bartolec (born 1995), Croatian football player
Karlo Belak (born 1991), Croatian football player
Karlo Bilić (born 1993), Croatian football player 
Karlo Bručić (born 1992), Croatian football player
Karlo Bulić (1910 - 1986), Croatian actor
Karlo Butić (born 1998), Croatian football player
Karlo Calcina (born 1984), Peruvian football player
Karlo Čović (born 1945), Serbian wrestler
Karlo Erak (born 1995), Croatian water polo player
Karlo Filipović (born 1954), Bosnia and Herzegovina politician
Karlo Hmeljak (born 1983), Slovenian sailor and poet
Karlo Ivancic (born 1994), Croatian footballer
Karlo Kamenar (born 1994), Croatian football player
Karlo Kreković (born 1999), Croatian water polo player
Karlo Lanza (1778 – 1834), Dalmatian politician
Karlo Letica (born 1997), Croatian football player
Karlo Lukanov (1897 – 1982), Bulgarian politician
Karlo Lulić (born 1996), Croatian football player
Karlo Maquinto (1990 - 2012), Filipino boxer
Karlo Mijić (1887–1964), Yugoslav painter 
Karlo Mila, New Zealand poet
Karlo Muradori, Croatian football player
Karlo Nograles (born 1976), Filipino politician
Karlo Pavlenć (1926 – 1987), Croatian rower
Karlo Požgajčić (born 1982), Croatian figure skater
Karlo Primorac (born 1984), Croatian football player
Karlo Ressler, Croatian politician
Karlo Sakandelidze (1928 – 2010), Georgian actor
Karlo Šimek (born 1988), Croatian football player
Karlo Štajner (1902 – 1992), Austrian activist and Gulag survivor
Karlo Stipanić (born 1941), Croatian water polo player
Karlo Težak (born 1993), Croatian football player
Karlo Toth (1907 – 1988), Yugoslav wrestler
Karlo Uljarević (born 1998), Croatian basketball player
Karlo Umek (1917 – 2010), Slovenian sports shooter 
Karlo Vragović (born 1989), Croatian basketball 
Karlo Weissmann (1890 – 1953), Croatian physician
Karlo Žganec (born 1995), Croatian basketball player
Karlo Malabanan (born 1969), Filipino RC Drift King

Surname
Tomislav Karlo (born 1970), Croatian swimmer

Middle name
Antun Karlo Bakotić (1831 – 1887), Croatian writer and physicist
Jovan Karlo Villalba (born 1977), American artist

Fictional character
Basil Karlo original version of Clayface, DC Comics character originating from Detective Comics, American book series

See also

Carlo (name)
Kahlo (surname)
Karl
Karla (name)
Karle (name)
Karli (name)
Karly
Karlos (name)
Karlov (surname)
Karlow (name)
Karo (name)
Karol (name)
Karoo (disambiguation)
Kaslo (disambiguation)

Notes

Albanian masculine given names
Basque masculine given names
Croatian masculine given names
Slovene masculine given names